In Greek mythology, Deiphobus  was a son of Priam and Hecuba.  He was a prince of Troy, and the greatest of Priam's sons after Hector and Paris.  Deiphobus killed four men of fame in the Trojan War.

Description 
Deiphobus was described by the chronicler Malalas in his account of the Chronography as " above average stature, keen-eyed, somewhat snub-nosed, dark-skinned, flat-faced, brave, good beard". Meanwhile, in the account of Dares the Phrygian, he was illustrated as ". . .looked like his father [i.e.  a handsome face]. He was the man of forceful action".

Mythology 

According to the Iliad (books XII, XIV, XXII), in the Trojan War Deiphobus, along with his brother Helenus, led a group of soldiers at the siege of the newly constructed Argive wall and killed many, and wounded the Achaean hero Meriones.  As Hector was fleeing Achilles, Athena took the shape of Deiphobus and goaded Hector to make a stand and fight. Hector, thinking it was his brother, listened and threw his spear at Achilles.  When the spear missed, Hector turned around to ask his brother for another spear, but "Deiphobus" had vanished. He then looked around for him but he was nowhere to be seen. It was then Hector knew the gods had deceived and forsaken him, and he met his fate at the hand of Achilles.  

Some accounts  hold that it was Deiphobus and Paris who ambushed and killed Achilles while luring him to their sister Polyxena.  After the death of Paris, Deiphobus was given Helen of Troy as a bride for his deeds in the war, defeating the bid of his other brother, Helenus. In his play, The Trojan Women, Euripides states that the marriage was by force and that she even felt “bitterly enslaved” in that relationship.  When the Trojan Horse was in the city, Deiphobus accompanied Helen as she walked around the horse, calling out the names of the Greeks within in the voices of their wives, because she did not want to look like she was helping them. Menelaus and Odysseus had to hold the men inside back from responding. During the sack of Troy, Deiphobus was slain by either Odysseus or Menelaus, and his body was mutilated. Some accounts  say it was Helen who killed him, or that she celebrated his death. Most accounts  seem to indicate that, unlike her other two husbands, Helen didn't love Deiphobus and decided she would rather return to Menelaus.

In Virgil's Aeneid, Deiphobus, horribly mutilated during the sack of Troy, appears to Aeneas in the Underworld. He tells him the story of his death, which entails Helen's betrayal in signaling Menelaus to Deiphobus's bedchamber. While with Aeneas, he begs the gods for revenge against the Greeks.

Cultural depictions 
 Deiphobus is a minor character in William Shakespeare's play Troilus and Cressida. 
 One modern account, The Luck of Troy by Roger Lancelyn Green, depicts him as a particularly unpleasant character.

Namesake 
 1867 Deiphobus, Trojan asteroid

See also 
 List of children of Priam

Notes

References 

 Gaius Julius Hyginus, Fabulae from The Myths of Hyginus translated and edited by Mary Grant. University of Kansas Publications in Humanistic Studies. Online version at the Topos Text Project.
 Homer, The Iliad with an English Translation by A.T. Murray, Ph.D. in two volumes. Cambridge, MA., Harvard University Press; London, William Heinemann, Ltd. 1924. Online version at the Perseus Digital xLibrary.
 Homer, Homeri Opera in five volumes. Oxford, Oxford University Press. 1920. Greek text available at the Perseus Digital Library.
 Publius Vergilius Maro, Aeneid. Theodore C. Williams. trans. Boston. Houghton Mifflin Co. 1910. Online version at the Perseus Digital Library.
 Publius Vergilius Maro, Bucolics, Aeneid, and Georgics. J. B. Greenough. Boston. Ginn & Co. 1900. Latin text available at the Perseus Digital Library.

Trojan Leaders
Characters in Book VI of the Aeneid
Children of Priam
Princes in Greek mythology